The Shengavit Medical Center is one of the leading private multi-disciplinary therapeutic and diagnostic hospital facilities in Yerevan, Armenia.  It is the base of the clinical postgraduate training for Yerevan State Medical University and the Ministry of Health (Armenia). The Center operates the following services: obstetrics, operative and endoscopic gynecology, oncology, reproductology, general and endoscopic surgery, micro- and plastic surgery, vascular surgery, ophthalmology, ENT, anesthesiology and critical care medicine, dentistry, diagnostic center, clinical laboratory.   There are 65 beds available in the hospital. On average there are 7000 patients served per year.

History 
In 1938, the Clinical Maternity Hospital No.3 of Yerevan was established. The current building has been operational since 1964. In 2001, the maternity hospital was transformed into the Shengavit Medical Center with a share belonging to the Yerevan municipality. In 2002, the ownership of the hospital became the property of the staff and it was reorganized into a multi-disciplinary clinical-diagnostic institution.

See also 
List of hospitals in Yerevan

References

Hospital buildings completed in 1964
Hospitals in Yerevan
Hospitals built in the Soviet Union